The Abun, previously also known as Wen and Karon, are an ethnic group of New Guinea, residing in the Sausapor district of the Tambrauw Regency in the province of Southwest Papua. They speak the Abun language. They live in the Sausapor, Jokte, Emaos and Uigwem  and are of the clans Yekwam, Yenjau, Yeblo, Yesnath, Yenbra, Yenggrem, Yesomkor, Yerin, Yeror, Yewen, Yemam and Yesian.

Name 
The Abun were originally the Wen from the Tambrauw Mountains (locally called the  Mountains). After having socialized with the  near the coastline, they were then called the Karon (meaning: the people from within), while the ones who continued to stay in the mountains were called Karondori. However, this eventually had negative connotations and they finally renamed themselves Abun.

Culture

Farming 
The Abun are primarily banana farmers. 21 categorizations of bananas are named and are divided by whether it is eaten fresh or cooked first. The harvesting of the bananas are done by both men and women; typically but not necessarily being the men chopping the trees and the women transporting the fruit. On most days, they head to the farms which are around 1–2 km away between 8–9am (WIT) and return home by 5pm.

Leadership 
Every  also has a leader  who help the  govern.

Salara Dance 
The Salara is a traditional dance performed in a group with a snake-like formation possibly in a circle; holding one another by the arms to form a chain. It is said that the ancestors of the Abun people turned into a snake and left the mountains for the beach.

See also

Indigenous people of New Guinea

References

External links 
 (YouTube video) Abun traditional dance in the Tambrauw Regency

Ethnic groups in Indonesia
Indigenous ethnic groups in Western New Guinea